Paweł Cibicki (born 9 January 1994) is a Swedish professional footballer. His preferred position is striker but he can also play as a winger. He was born in Malmö, Sweden to parents from Poland. He represented the Sweden U21 team at the 2017 UEFA European Under-21 Championship. In 2021 he was given a four year suspension for match fixing.

Club career

Malmö FF
On 23 November 2012, Cibicki signed a first-team contract on a youth basis with Malmö FF. Cibicki made his Allsvenskan debut for Malmö FF in a home fixture against Gefle IF on 7 July 2013. In total Cibicki played seven matches for the club during his first season, most of the matches coming on as a substitute for the attackers.

On 1 July 2014, Cibicki signed a first team contract with Malmö FF for three and a half additional years at the club. Previously in the summer of 2014 Cibicki had reached a verbal agreement with Dutch Eredivisie club FC Groningen, but he decided to stay at Malmö FF the day before the deal was about to be signed. Overall the 2014 season proved to be a breakthrough for Cibicki as he made 21 appearances for the club, scoring twice. His first league goal was scored against Halmstads BK at home on 12 May 2014 in a 3–1 victory. Cibicki also made three appearances in the group stage of the 2014–15 UEFA Champions League, registering one assist in Malmö's 2–0 win over Olympiacos.

During the 2016 season, Cibicki was loaned to Jönköpings Södra IF where he scored 10 goals in 26 matches and contributed to Jönköpings remaining in Allsvenskan. Whilst out on loan, in October 2016, he extended his contract with Malmö FF until the 2019 season and before the 2017 season he returned to Malmö, playing 20 times during the 2017 season, scoring five goals.

Leeds United
On 31 August, Leeds confirmed the signing of Cibicki on a four-year deal for an undisclosed fee (rumoured to be in the region of £1.5 million plus add-ons). He made his debut for Leeds just over two weeks later on 19 September in the League Cup third round tie against Premier League side Burnley which Leeds won in a penalty shootout after a 2–2 draw.

On 9 December, Cibicki made his league debut for the Whites against QPR at Loftus Road. Coming on as a substitute for the injured Caleb Ekuban, he marked his debut with an impressive display and provided an assist for Kemar Roofe to score his second goal of the match, Roofe eventually going on to score a hat-trick in Leeds' 3–1 win. Cibicki's second league appearance, a week later, saw another assist by the Swede from a free kick, which his former Malmö teammate Pontus Jansson converted, for a 1–0 win over Norwich.

Loan to Molde FK
On 3 July 2018, Cibicki joined Norwegian Eliteserien side Molde FK on loan until 31 December 2018, after being signed by Manager Ole Gunnar Solskjaer.

He made his competitive debut for Molde on 26 July 2018, starting in the UEFA Europa League 3–0 home victory against KF Laçi. On 5 August 2018 he made his league debut, starting away to Lillestrøm in a game ending 2–2. On 12 August 2018, Cibicki got his first goal for Molde, scoring the club's second goal before setting up the third, in a 5–1 win over league leaders Brann. In total he made 18 appearances for Molde, with 5 of those coming in the UEFA Europa League, before returning to Leeds at the end of his loan spell on 31 December 2018.

Loan to IF Elfsborg
On 11 January 2019, he joined IF Elfsborg on a 6 month loan with the option to buy. He scored his 1st goal for the club on 14 April in a 3–1 win over GIF Sundsvall, he started the season with 4 goals in his first 6 games for the club.

Loan to ADO Den Haag
On 21 August 2019, he joined ADO Den Haag on a season-long loan deal.

Pogoń Szczecin 
On 12 January 2020, Cibicki's loan to ADO Den Haag from Leeds United was cut short so he could complete a move to Polish Ekstraklasa side Pogoń Szczecin.

International career
Cibicki holds dual passports, from his country of birth, Sweden, and his parents' birth country Poland. In March 2013 he was called up by the Poland national under-19 team for two friendlies against Georgia. He played for 24 minutes after coming on as a substitute in the 3–1 win against Georgia in the first of two friendlies. In August 2016 he was called up to both Poland U21 and Sweden U21. Cibicki chose to play for his country of birth, Sweden.

In June 2017, he played all three games for Sweden U21 in the 2017 UEFA European Under-21 Championship held at his parents' Poland. As he is yet to be called up to the Sweden senior team, he remains eligible to represent Poland.

Match fixing
In June 2019 suspicion about a match fixing event in a game between Allsvenskan team IF Elfsborg and Kalmar FF was announced, Who the player was, was however not revealed. Later the same month the Swedish, Polish and the Swedish prosecutor's office announced that would launch an investigation on the matter.
Then in december 2020 the prosecutor's office announced that they would prosecute the player, along with three other players from other match fixing incidents, and it was revealed that the case evolved around the player receiving money, in form of a loan, after the match from a person who had betted on that the player would get a yellow card in the match, which the player ended up receiving in the 60th minute of the match, it was also at the time revealed that the player was Cibicki.

On 7 June 2021 it was announced that the district court acquitted Cibicki on all accusation, However the decision was appealed to Hovrätten (Swedish courts of appeals), in September the Swedish FA (SvFF) decided to ban Cibicki from football for four years and in december of 2021 Hovrätten went on the prosecutors side and convicted Cibicki of taking bribes, but sentenced him to only probation.

Prior to receiving the sentence Cibicki appeared on the podcast Heltidsproffs (eng:Full-time professional) and told his side of the story, about how he had struggled with a gambling addiction since the age of 18 and had gambled away millions of swedish kronor and that he because of it had struggled with suicidal thoughts.

Following the sentencing Cibicki appealed the verdict to Supreme Court of Sweden, while FIFA at the same time announced that they sided with the Swedish FA and banned Cibicki from football on a global scale for four years. Cibicki tried to have Riksidrottsnämnden, the Supreme Court of sports in Sweden, revoke the Swedish FA's ban, but on 9 March 2022 the application was rejected.

On 14 March the Swedish Supreme Court announced that they would not try Cibicks appeal, hence the convicting ruling of the Hovrätten would remain.

Career statistics

Honours
Malmö FF
Allsvenskan: 2013, 2014, 2017
Svenska Supercupen: 2013, 2014

References

External links

Paweł Cibicki at Leeds United

1994 births
Living people
Footballers from Malmö
Footballers from Skåne County
Polish footballers
Poland youth international footballers
Swedish footballers
Sweden under-21 international footballers
Sweden youth international footballers
Malmö FF players
Jönköpings Södra IF players
Leeds United F.C. players
Molde FK players
IF Elfsborg players
Allsvenskan players
Eliteserien players
English Football League players
Polish expatriate footballers
Swedish expatriate footballers
Expatriate footballers in England
Polish expatriate sportspeople in England
Swedish expatriate sportspeople in England
Expatriate footballers in Poland
Swedish people of Polish descent
Citizens of Poland through descent
Association football forwards
Association football wingers